Bouloumpoukou Sport FC is a Burkinabé football club which (as of 2021) plays in the Burkinabé Deuxième Division, having been relegated from the Burkinabé Premier League at the conclusion of the 2016-2017 season.

Stadium
Currently the team plays at the 5,000 capacity Stade Balibiè.

References

Football clubs in Burkina Faso